San Jorge is a municipality in the Honduran department of Ocotepeque.

Demographics
At the time of the 2013 Honduras census, San Jorge municipality had a population of 5,037. Of these, 97.08% were Mestizo, 1.39% Indigenous (0.89% Lenca, 0.42% Chʼortiʼ), 1.31% Black or Afro-Honduran and 0.22% White.

References

Municipalities of the Ocotepeque Department